It Happened to One Man is a 1940 British drama film directed by Paul L. Stein and starring Wilfrid Lawson, Nora Swinburne and Marta Labarr. The screenplay was scripted by Paul Merzbach and Nina Jarcis, based on the play of the same name by John Hastings Turner and Roland Pertwee. Produced by Victor Hanbury's British Eagle Productions,

It was distributed in the United States by RKO Pictures, and premiered in New York City at the Little Carnegie Playhouse on 22 February 1941.

Cast
 Wilfrid Lawson as Felton Quair  
 Nora Swinburne as Alice Quair  
 Marta Labarr as Rita  
 Ivan Brandt as Leonard Drayton  
 Reginald Tate as Ackroyd  
 Brian Worth as Jack Quair  
 Edmund Breon as Adm. Drayton  
 Patricia Roc as Betty Quair  
 Thorley Walters as Ronnie  
 Athole Stewart as Lord Kenley  
 Ruth Maitland as Lady Rapscombe  
 Ian Fleming as Sir Francis Hay

References

External links

1940 films
British drama films
1940 drama films
Films directed by Paul L. Stein
British black-and-white films
1941 drama films
1941 films
1940s English-language films
1940s British films